The Wukesong Arena, also known as the Cadillac Arena for sponsorship purposes, is a multipurpose indoor arena in Beijing. It was originally built for the 2008 Summer Olympics basketball preliminaries and finals. Ground was broken on 29 March 2005 and construction was completed on 11 January 2008.

The stadium has a capacity of 19,000 and covers an area of 63,000 square metres. It includes a modern, flexible ice hockey rink designed and produced by Finnish rink manufacturer Vepe Oy in November 2016.

In 2022, the arena hosted some of the ice hockey matches as part of the 2022 Winter Olympics.

History 

The stadium was constructed by "Beijing Wukesong Cultural & Sports Co. Ltd."  whose five shareholders are Zhongguancun CENCONS Group, Haidian State-owned Assets Investment Co. Ltd, Beijing Urban Construction Group Co. Ltd, Beijing Urban Construction Co. Ltd and the Tianhong Group. After the Olympic Games, the center became an important part of Beijing's Olympic Games heritage, allowing citizens to enjoy cultural, sports, leisure, recreational, and commercial activities. It was a large-scale comprehensive project, rare in Beijing in integrating cultural, sporting, and commercial purposes with large-scale gardens and green spaces.

On 6 January 2011 MasterCard Worldwide, the rival of Olympic sponsor Visa, announced the acquisition of the naming rights to the center. It was renamed MasterCard Center effective from 21 January 2011. Nearly five years later, on 16 December 2015, LeTV Sports announced that it has obtained naming rights for the arena. It was officially renamed as LeSports Center on 1 January 2016. Beyond that, LeSports promised to provide a package of intellectual services inside and outside the arena. After the closing of LeTV Sports, the arena was briefly named Huaxi Live. Since September 2017, the Cadillac division of General Motors has owned naming rights for the arena.

On 14 December 2015 the Kontinental Hockey League (KHL) announced that its Beijing expansion team would play in the arena. On 5 September 2016, Kunlun Red Star defenseman Anssi Salmela scored the first goal in the arena's first hockey game and the first home goal for Kunlun in KHL. Red Star won the game 6–3.

In 2017, 18,000 people attended the Chinese Basketball Association All-Star Game at the LeSports Centre.

Sporting events

Entertainment 
The Wukesong Arena is the biggest entertainment venue in Beijing, with many international, regional and local artists having staged their performance at the venue that spans a wide range of musical genres. International artists are highlighted using light blue in the table while non-concert entertainment events are also included.

Baseball field 

The Wukesong Baseball Field was a baseball stadium located next to the Wukesong Indoor Stadium at the Wukesong Culture and Sports Centre in Beijing, China. It was one of the nine temporary venues at the 2008 Summer Olympics, hosting baseball events.

The baseball field had a total land surface of 12,000 square metres and a capacity of 15,000. It included two competition fields and one training field.

In March 2008, the stadium hosted two games between the Los Angeles Dodgers and San Diego Padres called the MLB China Series, marking the first time Major League Baseball teams played in China.

In what were to be the final Olympic Baseball matches in the foreseeable future, as the International Olympic Committee voted out the baseball event for the upcoming 2012 London Olympics and 2016 Rio de Janeiro Olympics in favor of golf and rugby sevens, Team USA clinched the bronze medal, while South Korea beat Cuba to claim the gold medal. After the Olympic games ended, the facilities were demolished as planned, for a shopping mall called Bloomage LIVE · HI-UP.

See also
List of indoor arenas in China

References

External links 

 

Venues of the 2008 Summer Olympics
Venues of the 2022 Winter Olympics
Sports venues in Beijing
Indoor arenas in China
Basketball venues in China
Baseball in China
Olympic basketball venues
Olympic ice hockey venues
Sports venues completed in 2008
HC Kunlun Red Star